Closer: The Best of Sarah McLachlan is a greatest hits album by Canadian singer-songwriter Sarah McLachlan, and also contains two new tracks. It was released on 7 October 2008. The album was released in Germany on 17 October. The release date for Closer was pushed back to 11 May 2009 in the United Kingdom.

Track listing 
 "Vox" – 4:53
 "The Path of Thorns (Terms)" – 5:51
 "Into the Fire" – 3:31
 "Possession" – 4:38
 "Hold On" – 4:10
 "Good Enough" – 5:03
 "Building a Mystery" – 4:08
 "Sweet Surrender" – 4:02
 "Adia" – 4:05
 "Angel" – 4:30
 "I Will Remember You" (Live) – 3:34
 "Fallen" – 3:48
 "Stupid" – 3:23
 "World on Fire" – 4:23
 "Don't Give Up on Us" – 3:37
 "U Want Me 2" – 4:07

Deluxe edition 
Disc One
 "Vox" – 4:53
 "Steaming" – 4:44
 "Ben's Song" – 4:55
 "The Path of Thorns (Terms)" – 5:51
 "Into the Fire" – 3:31
 "Drawn to the Rhythm" – 4:09
 "Mercy" – 4:22
 "Possession" – 4:38
 "Hold On" – 4:10
 "Good Enough" – 5:03
 "Ice Cream" – 2:44
 "Fumbling Towards Ecstasy" – 4:50

Disc Two
 "Building a Mystery" – 4:08
 "Sweet Surrender" – 4:02
 "Adia" – 4:05
 "Angel" – 4:30
 "I Will Remember You" (Live) – 3:34
 "Fallen" – 3:48
 "Stupid" – 3:23
 "World on Fire" – 4:23
 "Push" (Live) – 3:47
 "Don't Give Up on Us" – 3:37
 "U Want Me 2" – 4:07
 "Hold On" (Radio Remix) – 4:09
 "I Will Remember You" (Original Version) – 4:52
 "World on Fire" (Radio Remix) – 4:30
 "U Want Me 2" (Radio Remix) – 4:09
 "Silence" (Niels Van Gogh vs. Thomas Gold Remix Radio Edit) – 3:30
 UK Bonus track – Delerium & Sarah McLachlan .

Charts

Certifications and sales

Release history

References 

2008 greatest hits albums
Nettwerk Records compilation albums
Arista Records compilation albums
Sarah McLachlan compilation albums
Albums produced by Pierre Marchand
Albums produced by Greg Reely